The Roman Catholic Diocese of Cheongju is a diocese of the Latin Church of the Catholic Church located in Cheongju, South Korea. The diocese is suffragan to the Archdiocese of Daegu.  The current bishop is Gabriel Chang Bong-hun, appointed in 1999.

History
On 23 June 1958, Pope Pius XII erected the Apostolic Vicariate of Cheongju.  It was elevated to a diocese by Pope John XXIII on 10 March 1962.

Ordinaries

Apostolic Vicars of Cheongju
James Vincent Pardy, M.M. (1958–1962)

Bishops of Cheongju
James Vincent Pardy, M.M. (1962–1972) 
Nicholas Cheong Jin-suk (1970–1998), appointed Archbishop of Seoul, later Cardinal 
Gabriel Chang Bong-hun (1999–2022)
Simon Kim Jong-gang (2022–present)

References

See also
Catholic Church in South Korea

Christian organizations established in 1958
Cheongju
Cheongju
Cheongju
1958 establishments in South Korea
Roman Catholic Ecclesiastical Province of Daegu